Ash Flower is a 2016 South Korean drama film directed by Park Suk-young. It is the third and final film in Park's "Flower Trilogy" with Wild Flowers and Steel Flower. It stars Jeong Ha-dam and Jang Hae-gum.

Cast
Jeong Ha-dam as Ha-dam
Jang Hae-gum as Hae-byul
Jung Eun-kyung as Sam-soon 
Park Myung-hoon as Myong-ho
Park Hyun-young as Jin-kyung 
Kim Tae-hee as Chul-ki

References

External links

2016 films
2016 drama films
South Korean drama films
South Korean independent films
2016 independent films
2010s South Korean films